St Mary's Catholic College (SMC) is a Catholic secondary school located in Wallasey, Wirral, in North West England. St Mary's is one of four Catholic secondary schools in the Metropolitan Borough of Wirral. The others are St Anselm's College, St John Plessington Catholic College and Upton Hall School FCJ.

St Mary's is a Roman Catholic secondary school and sixth form with academy status located in Wallasey, Wirral, England.

St Mary's Catholic College (SMC)  is part of St John Plessington Catholic College (SJP) and work in very close relationship to further both schools.

Pastoral care 
There are numerous pastoral systems in place in SMC which care for a student's college life. The two most notable pastoral system are the form and year group systems. Each year group comprises eight forms which are each named after one of the forty catholic martyrs of England and Wales and then divided up into two half year groups named Alpha and Beta. These eight forms are:

Alpha Half Year:
 JB - abbreviating St. John Bosco.
 VP - abbreviating St. Vincent De Paul.
 MT - abbreviating Mother Teresa.
 TL - abbreviating St. Therese of Lisieux
Beta Half Year:
 BH - abbreviating Basil Hume
 SB - abbreviating St. Bernadette of Lourdes.
 OR - abbreviating St. Óscar Romero
 MK - abbreviating Maximillian Kolbe.
House System:

As well as the year group system, there is also a house system. Every student in the school is placed into one of six houses which are named after saints or prominent Catholic figures. These houses are:
 Romero - Named after Óscar Romero.
 Kolbe - Named after Maximillian Kolbe
 Teresa - Named after Mother Teresa.
 Bosco - Named after St John Bosco
 Hume - Named after Basil Hume.
 Bernadette - Named after St Bernadette of Lourdes.
The school also enables and encourages students to report incidents of bullying, theft, crime or any unwanted behaviour in confidence to their school 24 hours a day via the TextSomeone system the school has introduced, along with the CallParents and Truancy Call systems, introduced to free up staff time usually consumed with administrative tasks.

Notable former pupils 
 Timothy Brown (bassist) (b 1969), bassist with The Boo Radleys. 
 Michelle Butterly (b 1969), actress. 
 Martin Carr (b 1968), chief songwriter and lead guitarist with The Boo Radleys.
 Louise Delamere (b 1974), actress. 
 Jonathan Walters (b 1983), Premiership footballer.

Campus 
From 2002 to 2004, a £12.5 million building programme took place at St. Mary's. This almost doubled the accommodation size of the whole school. This enabled the school to comfortably deal with rising pupil numbers. The building programme also addressed all of the accommodation shortfalls highlighted in the Ofsted report of March 2002.

In April 2003, the Science and Technology Building opened, along with a new school chapel, extended library, Sixth form common room and study base, extra classrooms and two computer resource bases.

In May 2004, the new Arts Block was opened, in time for the school to become a Specialist College for the Arts in September. There were two new drama studios, a fully equipped dance studio, three art rooms, two new computer rooms and five additional classrooms. The Music Department now has its own recording studio and soundproof practice rooms.

The buildings include 19 classrooms (16 general and 3 Design and Technology), larger PE changing rooms, expanded and upgraded office/reception areas, improved access for students with limited mobility, three refurbished laboratories, and more dining room space.

The current buildings' capacity can accommodate up to 1,850 students. Eight forms of entry and an anticipated sixth form roll of 300 +.

In 2018 the school removed a wall in front of the girls' toilets to cut down on juvenile delinquency; in response parents pulled their children out of school and complained.

Significant events 
On 1 December 2011, students from St. Mary's College were invited to perform for HM The Queen and HM The Duke of Edinburgh when they officially opened the Floral Pavilion in New Brighton.

On 1 November 2016, St Mary's Catholic College became an academy. St Mary's Catholic College...A Voluntary Aided Academy.

References

External links
 GOV.UK information
 Ofsted reports

Secondary schools in the Metropolitan Borough of Wirral
Wallasey
Academies in the Metropolitan Borough of Wirral